Enzenkirchen (Central Bavarian: Enznkira) is a municipality in the district of Schärding in the Austrian state of Upper Austria.

Geography
Enzenkirchen lies in the Innviertel. About 22 percent of the municipality is forest, and 70 percent is farmland.

References

Sauwald
Cities and towns in Schärding District